Cardinal Manning may refer to 

 Henry Edward Manning (1808–1892), English cardinal and Archbishop of Westminster
 Timothy Manning (1909–1989), American cardinal and Archbishop of Los Angeles